Mariano Raúl Echeverría (born 27 May 1981) is a retired Argentine football defender and current coach. He is currently the head coach of Johor Darul Ta'zim II.

Career

Club career
Echeverría began his playing career in the lower leagues of Argentine football. After many years playing for teams such as Luján de Cuyo and Deportivo Maipú in the regionalised lower divisions he joined 2nd division side Chacarita Juniors. In his first season with the club they won promotion to the Primera División.

International career
Echeverría made his debut for the Argentina national team after being called up to join Diego Maradona's squad of Argentina-based players who beat Jamaica 2-1 on 10 February 2010.

Coaching career

CA Tigre
On 5 October 2018, Echeverría was appointed as the new head coach of Club Atlético Tigre, which was his first real coaching job. Three days after a 4-4 result on 8 February 2019 against Club Atlético Banfield, Echeverría resigned from his position. Echeverría had been furious about the result and the performance of his team.

Johor Darul Ta'zim II
Echeverría was appointed as a new head coach for Johor Darul Ta'zim II of Malaysia on 4 February 2022.

References

External links
 
 
 
  
 

1981 births
Living people
Sportspeople from Mar del Plata
Argentine people of Basque descent
Argentine footballers
Argentina international footballers
Association football defenders
Argentine Primera División players
Chacarita Juniors footballers
Club Atlético Tigre footballers
Boca Juniors footballers